Zachary Elbouzedi (born 5 April 1998) is an Irish professional footballer who plays as a midfielder for AIK.

Club career

Inverness Caledonian Thistle
Elbouzedi started his career with Malahide United before he joined Inverness Caledonian Thistle on a free transfer deal in the summer of 2017 from West Bromwich Albion. He was not able to play immediately due to an injury, but manager John Robertson believed he would compete for a place in the team when healthy.

Elgin City (Loan)
He was signed by Elgin City on a 28 day long emergency loan contract on 30 December 2017.

After working himself back to match fitness by playing for Elgin City, Elbouzedi made his professional debut for Inverness Caledonian Thistle on 13 March 2018 against Dunfermline Athletic.

Waterford
Zak left Inverness on 31 August 2018, after terminating his contract by mutual consent after an injury ravaged season and only playing in one game in the 2018–19 season, which was a League Cup win over Cove Rangers.

On 7 November 2018, Elbouzedi joined League of Ireland Premier Division side Waterford.

He made 29 appearances for the Blues in all competitions, scoring 6 goals in an impressive season personally despite a disappointing season for the club as they finished in sixth place.

Lincoln City
On 16 December 2019, it was announced that Elbouzedi would move to English club Lincoln City on 1 January 2020 after signing a long-term deal with the club. He scored his first goal for Lincoln in an EFL Trophy tie against Shrewsbury Town on 8 December 2020.

Bolton Wanderers (loan)
On 16 January 2021, he would join Bolton Wanderers on loan for the remainder of the season. He would make his debut a few hours later, starting the EFL League Two game against Cheltenham Town.

AIK
On 15 July 2021, it was confirmed that he would join Swedish Allsvenskan side AIK for an undisclosed fee, signing a contract until 31 December 2024. He would make his AIK and Allsvenskan debut just a few days later, coming off the bench in the 85th minute against Kalmar FF.

International career
Elbouzedi has represented the Republic of Ireland at youth international level. He remains eligible to play for the Libya national football team due to his father being Libyan and has been contacted about representing Libya but has always stated he only ever wanted to play for the Republic of Ireland. Elbouzedi was capped at under 21 level for the first time in 2019 and was selected for the 2019 Toulon Tournament.

Personal life
Elbouzedi was born in Dublin to a Libyan father and an Irish mother.

Career statistics

Honours
Inverness CT
Scottish Challenge Cup: 2017–18

Bolton Wanderers
EFL League Two third-place (promotion): 2020–21

References

Inverness Caledonian Thistle F.C. players
1998 births
Republic of Ireland association footballers
Scottish Professional Football League players
League of Ireland players
English Football League players
West Bromwich Albion F.C. players
Elgin City F.C. players
Living people
Republic of Ireland youth international footballers
Irish people of Libyan descent
Irish sportspeople of African descent
Association footballers from Dublin (city)
Association football midfielders
Malahide United F.C. players
Lincoln City F.C. players
Waterford F.C. players
Bolton Wanderers F.C. players
AIK Fotboll players
Allsvenskan players
Republic of Ireland expatriate association footballers
Irish expatriate sportspeople in Sweden
Expatriate footballers in Sweden